Persija Barat stands for Persatuan Sepakbola Indonesia Jakarta Barat is an Indonesian football club based in West Jakarta, Jakarta. Club played at Liga 3.

References

External links
Liga-Indonesia.co.id
 

West Jakarta
Football clubs in Jakarta
Football clubs in Indonesia
Association football clubs established in 1979
1979 establishments in Indonesia